Parliamentary elections were held in Afghanistan in 1949 after a royal proclamation was issued calling upon the people to elect the National Assembly. The elections decided the members for the 1949–1951 parliamentary term and were considered relatively free.

References

Elections in Afghanistan
Afghanistan
1949 in Afghanistan
National Assembly (Afghanistan)
Election and referendum articles with incomplete results